Group D of the 1997 Fed Cup Europe/Africa Zone Group I was one of four pools in the Europe/Africa Zone Group I of the 1997 Fed Cup. Three teams competed in a round robin competition, with the top two teams advancing to the knockout stage.

Slovenia vs. Latvia

Israel vs. Georgia

Slovenia vs. Georgia

Israel vs. Latvia

Slovenia vs. Israel

Latvia vs. Georgia

  failed to win any ties in the pool, and thus was relegated to Group II in 1998, where they placed first in their pool of six, and thus advanced back to Group I for 1999.

See also
Fed Cup structure

References

External links
 Fed Cup website

1997 Fed Cup Europe/Africa Zone